Alexander Thomson (9 November 1914 – 2 February 1979) was a Scottish advocate and judge. He was a Senator of the College of Justice from 1965 until his death in 1979. He had been Sheriff of Renfrew and Argyll from 1962 to 1964 and Dean of the Faculty of Advocates from 1964 to 1965.

References

1914 births
1979 deaths
Senators of the College of Justice
Deans of the Faculty of Advocates
Scottish sheriffs